Saša Ivković (born 13 May 1993) is a Serbian footballer who plays for Baniyas as a defender.

Career
He made his professional debut for Partizan on 7 December 2013 in a league match against Čukarički, replacing Saša Ilić near the end of the match.

Personal life
Although born in Vukovar, he was raised in Bačka Palanka. He is a younger brother of Radovan Ivković.

References

External links
 
 

1993 births
Living people
Sportspeople from Vukovar
People from the Republic of Serbian Krajina
Serbs of Croatia
Croatian emigrants to Serbia
Serbian footballers
Association football defenders
Serbia youth international footballers
Serbian expatriate footballers
FK Partizan players
FK Teleoptik players
OFK Bačka players
FK Voždovac players
F.C. Ashdod players
NK Maribor players
Baniyas Club players
Serbian First League players
Serbian SuperLiga players
Israeli Premier League players
Slovenian PrvaLiga players
UAE Pro League players
Expatriate footballers in Israel
Serbian expatriate sportspeople in Israel
Serbian expatriate sportspeople in Slovenia
Expatriate footballers in Slovenia
Serbian expatriate sportspeople in the United Arab Emirates
Expatriate footballers in the United Arab Emirates